Roei Dayan (pronounced Rō'ī Dayan; born September 19, 1984) is a retired Israeli professional footballer who is mostly known for his time playing in Maccabi Tel Aviv and Hapoel Acre.

Playing career

Club career
A product of the Maccabi Tel Aviv youth system, Dayan played his first match in the full team when he came on as a substitute in a Toto Cup match.

After being supposedly released by Maccabi, Dayan joined Scottish side, St Mirren for a week long trial. He impressed manager, Gus MacPherson, enough to have his trial extended by another week before being offered a contract.

However the proposed deal to bring him to St Mirren has fallen through because of the €400,000 price tag that Maccabi Tel Aviv placed on Dayan.

On 29 June 2011, Dayan signed a two-year contract with Belgian Pro League side Beerschot AC.

National team
Dayan was a part of the player pool for the Israel national under-21 football team that qualified for the 2007 UEFA European Under-21 Football Championship in the Netherlands.

References

1984 births
Living people
Israeli Jews
Israeli footballers
Maccabi Tel Aviv F.C. players
Hakoah Maccabi Ramat Gan F.C. players
Hapoel Tel Aviv F.C. players
Hapoel Kfar Saba F.C. players
Hapoel Acre F.C. players
Beerschot A.C. players
Maccabi Petah Tikva F.C. players
F.C. Ashdod players
Hakoah Maccabi Amidar Ramat Gan F.C. players
F.C. Holon Yermiyahu players
Shimshon Tel Aviv F.C. players
Israeli expatriate footballers
Expatriate footballers in Belgium
Israeli expatriate sportspeople in Belgium
Israeli Premier League players
Belgian Pro League players
Liga Leumit players
Israeli people of Moroccan-Jewish descent
Footballers from Tel Aviv
Association football forwards